Alduin may refer to:

 Alduin I of Angoulême (died 916), Count of Angoulême from 886
 Alduin II of Angoulême, Count of Angoulême; son and successor of William II of Angoulême
 Alduin or Audoin (died 563/5), king of the Lombards from 546 to 560
 Alduin (dragon), the antagonist in The Elder Scrolls V: Skyrim

See also
 Aldwin (disambiguation)

Germanic given names